Parkhill (Yellow Gold) Aerodrome  is located adjacent to Parkhill, Ontario, Canada.

References

Registered aerodromes in Ontario
Transport in Middlesex County, Ontario